The Space Nanotechnology Laboratory performs research in interference lithography and diffraction grating fabrication.  It has fabricated the high energy transmission gratings for one of NASA's Great Observatories, the Chandra X-Ray Observatory.  It is also the home of the Nanoruler, a unique and high-precision grating patterning tool.

External links
Space Nanotechnology Laboratory

Space telescopes
Massachusetts Institute of Technology